My Neighbor's Wife is a 2011 Filipino drama film directed by Jun Lana, starring Dennis Trillo, Lovi Poe, Jake Cuenca, and Carla Abellana. The film premiered nationwide on September 14, 2011, under Regal Films. The movie was  distributed by GMA Pictures for Philippine TV Preimere.

Plot
Two couples succumb to desire and longing.

Cast
Dennis Trillo as Aaron Santillan 
Lovi Poe as Giselle Perez
Jake Cuenca as Bullet Bernal
Carla Abellana as Jasmine Bernal
Dimples Romana as Tessa Vergara
Yogo Singh as Timothy 'Tommy' Bernal

Cameos
Katrina Halili	
Princess Manzon	
Alvin Fortuna	
Cara Eriguel
Shey Bustamante	
April Sun	
Jovic Susim	
Aries Go
Isaiah Ersty

Awards and nominations
2012 28th PMPC Star Awards for Movies Movie of the Year - Nominated
Movie Actress of the Year for (Lovi Poe) - Nominated
2012 FAP 30th Luna Awards Best Actress (Lovi Poe) - Nominated
2012 FAP 30th Luna Awards Best Supporting Actress (Carla Abellana) - Nominated
Best Cinematography (Mo Zee) - Nominated
Best Editing (Tara Illenberger) - Nominated
Best Musical Scorer (Jesse Lucas) - Nominated
Best Sound Lamberto Casas Jr.) - Nominated

References

External links
 
 My Neighbor's Wife at Box Office Mojo

Philippine drama films
2011 films
2010s romance films
Regal Entertainment films